Death and the Maiden (Der Tod und das Mädchen in German) was a common motif in Renaissance art, especially painting and prints in Germany. The usual form shows just two figures, with a young woman being seized by a personification of Death, often shown as a skeleton. Variants may include other figures. It developed from the Danse Macabre with an added erotic subtext. The German artist Hans Baldung depicted it several times.

The motif was revived during the romantic era in the arts, a notable example being Franz Schubert's song "Der Tod und das Mädchen", setting a poem by the German poet Matthias Claudius. Part of the piano part was re-used in Schubert's famous String Quartet No. 14, which is therefore also known by this title, in either English or German.

Selected versions
Painting: Death and the Maiden (Der Tod und das Mädchen) by Niklaus Manuel Deutsch I (1517)
Painting: Death and the Maiden (Der Tod und das Mädchen) by Hans Baldung Grien (1517)
Engraving: Death and the Maiden (Døden og Piken) by Edvard Munch (1894)
Painting: Death and the Maiden (Der Tod und das Mädchen) by Adolf Hering (1900) - the painting is part of a private collection, the location is unknown.
Painting: Death and the Maiden by Marianne Stokes (1908)
Painting: Death and the Maiden (Tod und Mädchen) by Egon Schiele (1915)
Drawing: Death and the Maiden (Der Tod und das Mädchen) by Clara Siewert (1920s)
Drawing: Death and the Maiden (Der Tod und das Mädchen) by Joseph Beuys (1959)

Notes

References

Death and the Maiden @ La Mort dans l'Art

Iconography
Women and death
Renaissance art
Romanticism
Personifications of death
Visual motifs